We're All Gonna Die is the fifth studio album by American folk rock band Dawes. It was announced on August 17, 2016, with the release of the lead single, "When the Tequila Runs Out". The album was released on September 16, 2016. It was produced by former bandmate (when they performed as Simon Dawes) Blake Mills.

Critical reception 

We're All Gonna Die received moderate praise upon release. At Metacritic, which assigns a normalized rating out of 100 to reviews from music critics, the album has received an average score of 77, indicating "generally favorable" reviews, based on 6 critics.

Accolades

Track listing

Personnel

Dawes
Taylor Goldsmith – vocals, guitars, pianet (2), slide guitar (7)
Griffin Goldsmith – drums, vocals, percussion (3, 4, 5, 7, 8, 9), lead vocals (6)
Wylie Gelber – bass, Kee bass (8)
Lee Pardini – piano (2, 5, 6, 8, 10), Ace Tone (2, 5, 7, 8), pianet (3, 5, 7), Juno (4, 8), clavinet (1, 9), organ (4), vocals

Additional Musicians
Blake Mills – guitars (1, 3, 5, 7, 8, 9), vocals (2, 6, 7, 8, 9), drum programming (4), bass (5), glockenspiel (7), slide guitar (8), Korg MS-20 (9)
Rob Moose – strings (2, 6, 10)
Jim James – vocals (2, 7)
Mandy Moore – vocals (4)
Lucius (Jess Wolf & Holly Laessig) – vocals (4)
Jim Keltner – MPC (7)
Brittany Howard – vocals (7)
Will Oldham – vocals (7)
Nate Walcott – trumpet (10)
(*Jim James appears courtesy of Capitol Music Group)
(*Brittany Howard appears courtesy of ATO Records)

Charts 

Airplay

References 

2016 albums
Dawes (band) albums
Albums produced by Blake Mills